These fraternities are all members of the Wingolf.

The list shows both active and inactive fraternities. The latter are considered „vertagt“. In these cases, the tradition is sometimes continued by other fraternities, otherwise only the associations of the alumni remain („Alte Herren“ or „Philister“) remain. Two fraternities are deceased – the Hohenheimer Wingolf, which however has a local successor, and the Danziger Wingolf.

The list also shows the country where the fraternity is based. In the case of a inactive Studentenverbindung, this may vary historically. The city of Königsberg, where the Königsberger Wingolf was located, used to belong to East Prussia and the German Reich, today it belongs to Russia and is called Kaliningrad.

Sources 
 Hans Waitz: Geschichte des Wingolfbundes aus den Quellen mitgeteilt und dargestellt. Waitz, Darmstadt 1896, 2. Auflage 1904, 3. Auflage 1926.
 Hans Waitz (Hrsg.): Geschichte der Wingolfsverbindungen. Waitz, Darmstadt 1913.
 Otto Imgart: Der Wingolfsbund in Vergangenheit und Gegenwart. In: Das Akademische Deutschland. Bd. 2: Die deutschen Hochschulen und ihre akademischen Bürger. Berlin 1931.
 Hugo Menze, Hans-Martin Tiebel: Geschichte des Wingolfs 1917–1970. Lahr 1971.
 Verband Alter Wingolfiten (Hrsg.): Geschichte des Wingolfs 1830–1994. 5. Auflage. Detmold 1998.

Notes

External links
 https://www.wingolf.org

Christian student societies in Germany
1844 establishments in Europe
Fraternities and sororities in Austria